Tripp Island is an island in the south part of Tripp Bay along the coast of Victoria Land. Discovered by the British Antarctic Expedition (1907–09) which named this feature for Leonard O.H. Tripp of Wellington, New Zealand, a friend and supporter of Ernest Shackleton.

See also 
 List of antarctic and sub-antarctic islands

Islands of Victoria Land
Scott Coast